Rina Saigo (born 17 October 2000) is a Japanese tennis player.

Saigo has a career-high singles ranking of 418 Women's Tennis Association (WTA), achieved on 21 November 2022. She also has a career-high WTA doubles ranking of 440, set on 6 February 2023.

Saigo made her WTA Tour debut at the 2022 Pan Pacific Open, after qualifying for the singles main draw.

ITF Circuit finals

Singles: 1 (1 title)

Doubles: 14 (5 titles, 9 runner–ups)

References

External links

 Rina Saigo Official Blog (in Japanese)

2000 births
Living people
People from Chiba Prefecture
Sportspeople from Chiba Prefecture
Japanese female tennis players
21st-century Japanese women